The list of ambassadors from Austria to South Korea began long after diplomatic relations were established in 1892. The current official title of this diplomat is "Ambassador of the Republic of Austria to the Republic of Korea."

Austrian-Korean diplomatic relations were initially established during the Dual Monarchy of the Austro-Hungarian Empire and  the Joseon period of Korean history.

After the Austria-Korea Treaty of 1892 was negotiated, ministers from Austria could have been appointed in accordance with this treaty.  However, diplomatic affairs were initially handled by the German representative in Seoul.

List of heads of mission

Ambassadors
 Peter Moser –1985.
 Helmut Boeck
 Wilhelm Donko, 2005–2009
 Josef Müllner, 2009–present

See also
 Austria-Korea Treaty of 1892
 List of diplomatic missions in South Korea

Notes

References
 Halleck, Henry Wager. (1861).  International law: or, Rules regulating the intercourse of states in peace and war 	New York: D. Van Nostrand. OCLC 852699
 Korean Mission to the Conference on the Limitation of Armament, Washington, D.C., 1921-1922. (1922). Korea's Appeal to the Conference on Limitation of Armament. Washington: U.S. Government Printing Office. OCLC 12923609

South Korea
Austria
List